Fernando Verdasco was the defending champion but chose not to defend his title.

Nuno Borges won the title after defeating Borna Gojo 6–4, 7–6(8–6) in the final.

Seeds

Draw

Finals

Top half

Bottom half

References

External links
Main draw
Qualifying draw

Monterrey Challenger - 1